Miles Atkinson (1741–1811) was an English cleric. He was one of the mid-century evangelicals in Yorkshire.

Life
He was the second son of the Rev. Christopher Atkinson, rector of Thorp Arch, Yorkshire. He was born at Ledsham 28 September 1741, and educated at Peterhouse, Cambridge (B.A. 1763). He became curate of the parish church of Leeds; head-master of the school of Drighlington, near Leeds (1764–70); lecturer of the parish church of Leeds, 1769; vicar of Kippax, near Leeds, 1783 and minister of St. Paul's Church, Leeds, 1793, which he founded at a cost of nearly £10,000. He was responsible for construction of St. Paul's vicarage in 1790.

Atkinson died on 6 February 1811.

Works
Atkinson published several pulpit discourses, and a collection of his Practical Sermons was published at London in two volumes, 1812.

References

Attribution

1741 births
1811 deaths
English Christian religious leaders
18th-century English people
19th-century English people
Clergy from Yorkshire
Alumni of Peterhouse, Cambridge
People from Castleford